The United States Army Field Artillery School (USAFAS) trains Field Artillery Soldiers and Marines in tactics, techniques, and procedures for the employment of fire support systems in support of the maneuver commander. The school further develops leaders who are tactically and technically proficient, develops and refines warfighting doctrine, and designs units capable of winning on future battlefields.
The school is currently located at Fort Sill, Oklahoma.

Vision
Be the world's premier Field Artillery force; modernized, organized, trained, and ready to integrate and employ Army, Joint and Multinational fires across multiple domains enabling victory through Unified Land Operations.

Mission
 The mission of the Field Artillery is to destroy, neutralize or suppress the enemy by cannon, rocket or missile fire and to help integrate all fire support assets into combined arms operations.
 The mission of the Field Artillery School: The U.S. Army Field Artillery School trains, educates and develops agile, adaptive and decisive Soldiers and leaders; engages, collaborates and partners with other branches, sister-services and other fires warfighting function proponents; and serves as the lead agent for the development of Field Artillery doctrine, concepts and dissemination of that knowledge to the Field Artillery force in support of commanders operating across the full spectrum of conflict and in the joint, inter-organizational and multinational (JIM) environment.

Endstate
The U.S. Army Field Artillery enables maneuver commanders to dominate in Unified Land Operations through effective targeting, integration and delivery of fires.

Heraldry

Device

Shield: Gules, a field piece of the 16th century paleways in plan Or.

Crest: On a wreath of the colors (Or and Gules) the arm of Saint Barbara embowed clothed of the second, issuing from the upper portion of an embattled tower Argent, and grasping flashes of lightning Proper.

Motto: CEDAT FORTUNA PERITIS (Let Fortune Yield to Experience, or Skill is Better than Luck).

Symbolism:The shield is red for Artillery; the field piece depicted, having been used in the 16th century, is the forerunner of the modern artillery. The crest is the arm of Saint Barbara, the patron saint of Artillery, holding flashes of lightning alluding to the pagan idea of Jove's ability to destroy with his bolts that which offended him.

Background: The device was originally approved for The Field Artillery School in 8 April 1926. It was redesignated for The Artillery School on 19 May 1954. On 11 September 1957 the device was redesignated for the U.S. Artillery and Missile School. On 13 February 1969 it was redesignated for the U.S. Field Artillery School.

Shoulder sleeve insignia
Description/Blazon: On a scarlet shield edged with a 1/8 inch (.32 cm) yellow border, 3 inches (7.62 cm) in height and 2 inches (5.08 cm) in width overall, a yellow field piece.

Symbolism: The ancient field piece is taken from the device of the Field Artillery School, as well as the colors scarlet and yellow which are for Artillery.

Background: The shoulder sleeve insignia was originally approved on 17 July 1970 for the U.S. Army Field Artillery School. It was amended on 9 June 1981 to extend authorization for wear to include personnel assigned to the U.S. Army Field Artillery Center. (TIOH Dwg. No. A-1-188)

Distinctive unit insignia
Description/Blazon: A gold color metal and enamel device 1 inch (2.54 cm) in height overall on a shield Gules, a field piece of the 16th century paleways in plan Or.

Symbolism: The shield is red for Artillery; the field piece depicted, having been used in the 16th century, is the forerunner of the modern artillery.

Background: The distinctive unit insignia was originally approved for the Field Artillery School on 29 March 1930. It was redesignated for the Artillery School on 19 May 1954. On 11 September 1957 the insignia was redesignated for the U.S. Army Artillery and Missile School. The distinctive unit insignia was redesignated for the U.S. Field Army Artillery School on 13 February 1969. It was amended on 9 June 1981 to extend authorization for wear to personnel assigned to the U.S. Army Field Artillery Center.

History

The origin of USAFAS can be traced back to the 1907 reorganization of the Artillery Corps and to the character of Fort Sill at that time. The 1907 reorganization created Coast and Field Artillery Branches. In the process of this reorganization, the Field Artillery was deprived of its former home at Fort Monroe, Virginia. Fort Sill was considered the best location for a Field Artillery school, since its  reservation allowed ample room for target practice and its great variety of terrain offered an excellent area for different types of tactical training. In addition, the post had already assumed the character of the home of artillery with a large number of artillery units assigned.

The first artillery school, the US Army School of Fire, was organized in 1911 by Captain Dan Tyler Moore. With the exception of a brief period in 1916 when school troops were used as frontier security guards during the Mexican Revolution, the School has operated and expanded continuously. Hundreds of thousands of artillerymen have been trained at Fort Sill since the inception of the School.

After the United States entered World War I, the school reopened in 1917 with Col. William J. Snow as commandant.  The Field Artillery School, as it was now known, added more courses. After the war, school commandants began a long-range program to improve field artillery mobility, gunnery and equipment. Budget cuts during the 1920s hampered their efforts, but innovative directors of the Gunnery Department, with support from school commandants, helped modernize the field artillery in the 1930s. 
Maj. Carlos Brewer, director of the Gunnery Department in the late 1920s and early 1930s, introduced new fire direction techniques so fire support would be more responsive. Maj. Orlando Ward, the next department director, developed the fire direction center to centralize command and control and to facilitate massing fire. Brewer, Ward, and Lt. Col. H.L.C. Jones encouraged replacing horses with motor vehicles for moving field artillery guns.
 
During World War II, to best use new long-range guns and better response times, the Field Artillery School championed the use of air observation to control artillery fires. The War Department approved organic field artillery air observation in 1942. The artillery air observers adjusted massed fire and performed liaison, reconnaissance, and other missions during the war. Following the war, the school adapted to the atomic age and the Cold War. The War Department consolidated all artillery training and developments under the U.S. Army Artillery Center at Fort Sill in 1946. At that time, the center included the Artillery School, the Antiaircraft and Guided Missile School at Fort Bliss, Texas, and the Coast Artillery School at Fort Scott, Calif. The air defense artillery became its own branch in 1966.  In 1953, school personnel fired the first nuclear-capable fieldartillery gun (the 280mm gun known as Atomic Annie) at Frenchman's Flat, Nevada. During the 1950s, school personnel also helped develop rocket and missile warfare (The U.S. arsenal included the Honest John rocket, Corporal missile and Redstone missile) that could carry a nuclear warhead.

In 1963, the school tested aerial rocket artillery, which equipped helicopters with rockets. As demonstrated in the Vietnam War, aerial rocket artillery was effective. The school cooperated in the development of the Field Artillery Digital Automated Computer, commonly called FADAC, to compute fire direction data. Introduced in 1966-67, FADAC made the field artillery a leader in computer developments for the Army. After the Vietnam War, the school participated in the introduction of the Multiple-Launch Rocket System, the Army Tactical Missile System, the Paladin 155-mm. self-propelled howitzer, and other field artillery systems.

The field artillery's performance in military operations in Operation Desert Storm in 1990-91 and Iraq and Afghanistan from 2001 to today validated the school's modernization efforts. Field artillery officers and soldiers can do complicated logarithmic calculations to fire a mission in one moment or they can escort a supply convoy, secure prisoners, patrol a village or any other mission the next.

Commandants 
Commandants of the Artillery School include John Patten Story, who commanded from 1902 to 1904.

Other commandants have included:

 Capt. Dan Tyler Moore, 19111914
 Lt. Col. Edward F. McGlachlin Jr., 1914–1916
 Col. William J. Snow, 1917
 Brig. Gen. Adrian S. Fleming, 1917–1918
 Brig. Gen. Laurin L. Lawson, 1918
 Brig. Gen. Dennis H. Currie, 1918–1919
 Brig. Gen. Edward T. Donnelly, 1919
 Maj. Gen. Ernest Hinds, 1919–1923
 Maj. Gen. George LeRoy Irwin, 1923–1928
 Brig. Gen. Dwight E. Aultman, 1928–1929
 Brig. Gen. William M. Cruikshank, 1930–1934
 Maj. Gen. Henry W. Butner, 1934–1936
 Brig. Gen. Augustine McIntyre Jr., 1936–1940
 Brig. Gen. Donald C. Cubbison, 1940
 Brig. Gen. George R. Allin, 1941–1942
 Brig. Gen. Jesmond D. Balmer, 1942–1944
 Maj. Gen. Orlando Ward, 1944
 Maj. Gen. Ralph T. Pennell, 1944–1945
 Maj. Gen. Louis E. Hibbs, 1945–1946
 Maj. Gen. Clift Andrus, 1946–1949
 Maj. Gen. Joseph M. Swing, 1949–1950
 Maj. Gen. Arthur M. Harper, 1950–1953
 Maj. Gen. Charles E. Hart, 1953–1954
 Maj. Gen. Edward T. Williams, 1954–1956
 Maj. Gen. Thomas E. deShazo, 1956–1959
 Maj. Gen. Verdi B. Barnes, 1959–1961
 Maj. Gen. Lewis S. Griffing, 1961–1964
 Maj. Gen. Harry H. Critz, 1964–1967
 Maj. Gen. Charles P. Brown, 1967–1970
 Maj. Gen. Roderick Wetherill, 1970–1973
 Maj. Gen. David E. Ott, 1973–1976
 Maj. Gen. Donald R. Keith, 1976–1977
 Maj. Gen. Jack N. Merritt, 1977–1980
 Maj. Gen. Edward A. Dinges, 1980–1982
 Maj. Gen. John S. Crosby, 1982–1985
 Maj. Gen. Eugene S. Korpal, 1985–1987
 Maj. Gen. Raphael J. Hallada, 1987–1991
 Maj. Gen. Fred F. Marty, 1991–1993
 Maj. Gen. John A. Dubia, 1993–1995
 Maj. Gen. Randall L. Rigby, 1995–1997
 Maj. Gen. Leo J. Baxter, 1997–1999
 Maj. Gen. Toney Stricklin, 1999–2001
 Maj. Gen. Michael D. Maples, 2001–2003
 Maj. Gen. David P. Valcourt, 2003–2005
 Maj. Gen. David C. Ralston, 2005–2007
 Maj. Gen. Peter M. Vangjel, 2007–2009
 Brig. Gen. Ross E. Ridge, 2009–2010
 Brig. Gen. Thomas S. Vandal, 2011–2012
 Brig. Gen. Brian J. McKiernan, 2012–2013
 Brig. Gen. Christopher F. Bentley, 2013–2014
 Brig. Gen. William A. Turner, 2014–2016
 Brig. Gen. Stephen J. Maranian, 2016–2018
 Brig. Gen. Stephen G. Smith 2018–2020
 Brig. Gen. Winston P. "Phil" Brooks 2020–2021
 Brig. Gen. Andrew D. Preston, 2021–present

See also
 Field Artillery Branch (United States)
 Field Artillery
 Ground combat element

References

Further reading

 
 
 
 
 

Army Field Artillery School
Comanche County, Oklahoma
United States Army schools